Samuel Ernest "George" Cash  (born 12 September 1946 in Subiaco, Western Australia) is a former Australian politician. A member of the Liberal Party, he represented Mount Lawley in the Western Australian Legislative Assembly, and later was a member of the Western Australian Legislative Council, representing the North Metropolitan Region.

Biography
Cash was awarded a Bachelor of Laws and then a Master of Laws at the University of Western Australia, later completing a Bachelor of Business. He worked as a business proprietor and a company director before entering parliament.

Prior to entering parliament, Cash was a City of Stirling councillor.

In 1984, he was elected to the Western Australian Legislative Assembly as the member for Mount Lawley at a by-election resulting from the resignation from parliament of then premier Ray O'Connor. Cash was re-elected in 1986 but the seat was abolished in a redistribution in 1988. He then switched to the Western Australian Legislative Council and was elected in the 1989 state election under the new proportional system which came into effect for the council. He served 20 years in that chamber, including four years as President between 1997 and 2001, while Richard Court was Premier, and was for several years thereafter the deputy president. He announced his retirement before the 2008 election, and his term ended on 21 May 2009.

In 2010 Cash was appointed a Member of the Order of Australia for service to the Parliament of Western Australia, and to the community. He is the father of Western Australian Senator Michaelia Cash.

References

Living people
Members of the Western Australian Legislative Assembly
Members of the Western Australian Legislative Council
Presidents of the Western Australian Legislative Council
Western Australian local councillors
Liberal Party of Australia members of the Parliament of Western Australia
1946 births
21st-century Australian politicians
Members of the Order of Australia
Australian monarchists